Top 100 historical figures may refer to:

The 100: A Ranking of the Most Influential Persons in History, a 1978 book
100 Greatest Britons, a BBC series about historical figures from the United Kingdom
Great South Africans, a South African TV series to determine the "100 Greatest South Africans"
Time 100, an annual list of the 100 most influential people in the American world

See also
Top 100 (disambiguation)
:Category:Greatest Nationals, with various national imitations of the 100 Greatest Britons, some of which were top 100 lists